Todd Woodbridge and Mark Woodforde were the defending champions, but Woodforde had retired from the tour. Woodbridge partnered with Jonas Björkman but lost in the third round to Bob and Mike Bryan.

Donald Johnson and Jared Palmer defeated Jiří Novák and David Rikl in the final, 6–4, 4–6, 6–3, 7–6(8–6), to win the gentlemen's doubles title at the 2001 Wimbledon Championships

Seeds

  Jonas Björkman /  Todd Woodbridge (third round)
  Daniel Nestor /  Sandon Stolle (second round)
  Jiří Novák /  David Rikl (final)
  Donald Johnson /  Jared Palmer (champions)
  Ellis Ferreira /  Rick Leach (quarterfinals)
  Mahesh Bhupathi /  Leander Paes (first round)
  Petr Pála /  Pavel Vízner (quarterfinals)
  Joshua Eagle /  Andrew Florent (second round)
  Michael Hill /  Jeff Tarango (third round)
  David Prinosil /  Cyril Suk (second round)
  Mark Knowles /  Brian MacPhie (third round)
  Wayne Black /  Kevin Ullyett (first round)
  Roger Federer /  Wayne Ferreira (third round, withdrew)
  Byron Black /  Alex O'Brien (first round)
  Bob Bryan /  Mike Bryan (semifinals)
  Scott Humphries /  Sébastien Lareau (first round)

Qualifying

Draw

Finals

Top half

Section 1

Section 2

Bottom half

Section 3

Section 4

References

External links

2001 Wimbledon Championships – Men's draws and results at the International Tennis Federation

Men's Doubles
Wimbledon Championship by year – Men's doubles